Oreophryne brevirostris is a species of frog in the family Microhylidae.
It is endemic to West Papua, Indonesia.
Its natural habitat is subtropical or tropical high-altitude grassland.

References

brevirostris
Amphibians of Western New Guinea
Taxonomy articles created by Polbot
Amphibians described in 2005